The 2017 WNBA season is the 18th season for the Indiana Fever of the Women's National Basketball Association. The Fever began play on May 14, 2017. The Fever started the season strong posting a 7–7 record in May and June.  However the second half of the season was not as positive.  The team finished 2–18 in the months of July August and September.  This brought their final record to 9–25, which was 6th place in the Eastern Conference, and next to last in the league.

Transactions

WNBA Draft

The Fever made two selections in the 2017 WNBA Entry Draft. The draft was held on April 13:

Trades

Personnel changes

Additions

Subtractions

Roster

Schedule

Game log

|-style="background:#fcc;"
| 1 || May 14, 20177:00 pm || Seattle || L 82–87 || Johnson - 24 || Johnson - 8 || Johnson - 4 || KeyArena7,969 || 0-1
|-style="background:#fcc;"
| 2 || May 17, 201710:00 pm || Phoenix || L 62–85 || Dupree - 14 || Dupree - 9 || Mitchell - 4 || Talking Stick Resort Arena8,896 || 0-2
|-style="background:#bbffbb"
| 3 || May 20, 20177:00 pm || Connecticut || W 81–79 || Dupree - 19 || Larkins - 9 || January - 4 || Bankers Life Fieldhouse7,385 || 1-2
|-style="background:#bbffbb"
| 4 || May 24, 20177:00 pm || Los Angeles || W 93–90 || Coleman - 19 || Dupree - 8 || January - 6 || Bankers Life Fieldhouse5,875 || 2-2
|-style="background:#fcc;"
| 5 || May 28, 20177:00 pm || Seattle || L 70–94 || Mitchell - 13 || Dupree - 5 || January - 3 || KeyArena4,722 || 2-3
|-style="background:#fcc;"
| 6 || May 30, 20178:00 pm || Dallas || L 62–89 || Achonwa - 13 || Larkins - 6 || Dupree - 3 || College Park Center3,076 || 2-4

|-style="background:#bbffbb"
| 7 || June 3, 20177:00 pm || Dallas || W 91–85 || Dupree - 18 || Achonwa - 7Larkins - 7 || January - 7 || Bankers Life Fieldhouse6,529 || 3-4
|-style="background:#fcc;"
| 8 || June 7, 201710:00 pm || Phoenix || L 90-98 || Wheeler - 24 || Larkins - 7 || Johnson - 5 || Bankers Life Fieldhouse5,702 || 3-5
|-style="background:#bbffbb"
| 9 || June 9, 20177:00 pm || Seattle || W 83-80 || Wheeler - 19 || Dupree - 12 || Wheeler - 6 || Bankers Life Fieldhouse6,166 || 4-5
|-style="background:#fcc;"
| 10 || June 11, 20173:00 pm || Washington || L 70-88 || Wheeler - 15 || Mitchell - 5 || Wheeler - 6 || Verizon Center6,194 || 4-6
|-style="background:#bbffbb"
| 11 || June 15, 20177:00 pm || Atlanta || W 85-74 || Wheeler - 20 || Dupree - 8 || Wheeler - 7 || Bankers Life Fieldhouse5,830 || 5-6
|-style="background:#bbffbb"
| 12 || June 18, 20176:00 pm || Chicago || W 91-79 || Mitchell - 19 || Dupree - 8 || January - 7 || Allstate Arena4,551 || 6-6
|-style="background:#fcc;"
| 13 || June 24, 20177:00 pm || Los Angeles || L 73-84 || Dupree - 14 || Larkins - 7 || Dupree - 3 || Bankers Life Fieldhouse9,241 || 6-7
|-style="background:#bbffbb"
| 14 || June 28, 201712:30 pm || Chicago || W 82-75 || Dupree - 17 || Mitchell - 7 || January - 7 || Allstate Arena10,197 || 7-7

|-style="background:#fcc;"
| 15 || July 1, 20174:00 pm || Connecticut || L 85-91 || Johnson - 22 || Dupree - 11 || Wheeler - 5 || Bankers Life Fieldhouse6,473 || 7-8
|-style="background:#fcc;"
| 16 || July 7, 20177:30 pm || Atlanta || L 68-89 || Johnson - 15 || Dupree - 5 || Tied - 3 || McCamish Pavilion3,359 || 7-9
|-style="background:#fcc;"
| 17 || July 12, 201712:00 pm || San Antonio || L 72-79|| Dupree - 14 || Tied - 3 || January - 6 || Bankers Life Fieldhouse12,282 || 7-10
|-style="background:#fcc;"
| 18 || July 14, 20177:00 pm || Washington || L 52-78 || January - 15 || Mitchell - 8 || January - 4 || Bankers Life Fieldhouse8,007 || 7-11
|-style="background:#fcc;"
| 19 || July 17, 201710:30 pm || Los Angeles || L 62-80 || January - 12 || Achonwa - 8 || Dupree - 4 || Staples Center11,386 || 7-12
|-style="background:#bbffbb"
| 20 || July 19, 20173:30 pm || Phoenix || W 84-77 || Wheeler - 20 || January - 7 || Tied - 7 || Talking Stick Resort Arena11,371 || 8-12
|-style="background:#fcc;"
| 21 || July 20, 20178:00 pm || San Antonio || L 61-85 || Mitchell - 13 || Dupree - 6 || January - 4 || AT&T Center7,306 || 8-13
|-style="background:#fcc;"
| 22 || July 25, 20178:00 pm || Dallas || L 82-84 || January - 16 || Dupree - 6 || Wheeler - 9 || College Park Center3,701 || 8-14
|-style="background:#fcc;"
| 23 || July 28, 20177:00 pm || New York || L 84-85 || Anchowa - 19 || Anchowa - 7 || Wheeler - 7 || Bankers Life Fieldhouse6,617 || 8-15
|-style="background:#fcc;"
| 24 || July 30, 20173:00 pm || Connecticut || L 73-89 || Tied - 13 || McCall - 9 || Tied - 4 || Mohegan Sun Arena6,145 || 8-16

|-style="background:#fcc;"
| 25 || August 4, 20177:00 pm || Chicago || L 70-81 || Dupree - 18 || Mitchell - 7 || January - 8 || Bankers Life Fieldhouse8,052 || 8-17
|-style="background:#bbffbb"
| 26 || August 6, 20175:00 pm || Minnesota || W 84-82 || Dupree - 31 || Dupree - 9 || Wheeler - 7 || Bankers Life Fieldhouse8,226 || 9-17
|-style="background:#fcc;"
| 27 || August 8, 20177:00 pm || New York || L 76-81 || Wheeler - 33 || Gwathmey-7 || January - 3 || Madison Square Garden10,068 || 9-18
|-style="background:#fcc;"
| 28 || August 12, 20177:30 pm || Washington || L 80-100 || Dupree - 26 || Dupree - 8 || Wheeler - 8 || Verizon Center7,337 || 9-19
|- style="background:#fcc;"
| 29 || August 18, 20178:00 pm || Minnesota || L 52-111 || Gwathmey-12 || Tied - 4 || Tied - 3 || Target Center  9,621 || 9-20
|- style="background:#fcc;"
| 30 || August 20, 20175:00 pm || Washington || L 82-87 || Coleman - 20 || McCall - 6 || Dupree - 7 || Bankers Life Fieldhouse  7,593 || 9-21
|- style="background:#fcc;"
| 31 || August 23, 20177:00 pm || New York || L 50-71 || Tied - 10 || Dupree - 6 || Wheeler - 5 || Bankers Life Fieldhouse  7,118 || 9-22
|- style="background:#fcc;"
| 32 || August 26, 20176:00 pm || Atlanta || L 74-79 || Wheeler - 23 || Achonwa - 9 || Coleman - 4 || McCamish Pavilion5,029 || 9-23
|- style="background:#fcc;"
| 33 || August 30, 20177:00 pm || Minnesota || L 69-80 || Wheeler - 17 || Dupree - 10 || Wheeler - 7 || Bankers Life Fieldhouse7,625 || 9-24

|- style="background:#fcc;"
| 34 || September 2, 20177:00 pm || San Antonio || L 71-75 || Dupree - 19 || Dupree - 13 || Wheeler - 6 || Bankers Life Fieldhouse9,420 || 9-25

Standings

References

External links
The Official Site of the Indiana Fever

Indiana Fever seasons
Indiana Fever
2017 in sports in Indiana